Glare/Halo is a 2006 EP by the Montreal-based instrumental shoegaze band Destroyalldreamers, released on Clairecord's affiliated project Claire's Echo and distributed by Tonevendor. It was released as a limited edition 12-inch vinyl record, with only 300 copies available. The recording and post-production phases were completed in the first half of 2006, making the album available to pre-order in June 2006, although it was not released officially until March 2007.

The album contains the two exclusive tracks "Dead on Arrival" and "À la Guerre Comme à la Mer", as well as two compositions that later appeared on their second LP Wish I Was All Flames. The album opening track, "Her Brother Played the Riot", occupying almost half of the EP with its play time of close to 16 minutes, was separated into three parts for the LP.

Track listing

Personnel

Destroyalldreamers
 Eric Quach - guitar, mixing, artwork, photography
 Mathieu Grisé - guitar
 Michèle Martin - bass guitar
 Shaun Doré - drums, mixing assistant

Production
 Shane Whitbread - recording
 Martin Valence - recording
 Harris Newman - mastering
 Abide Visuals - artwork design

References

External links
Album Page at Discogs
Album Description at Tonevendor

2007 EPs
Destroyalldreamers albums